Barbara Wall (née Barbara Lucas; 1911 – 8 April 2009) was an English Catholic writer active in organizations linked to Catholic peace traditions. In 1972 she received the Benemerenti medal for her work for peace. She wrote under her maiden name, Barbara Lucas, and was a founder of the British version of The Catholic Worker. She also did numerous translations.

She was the mother of Bernardine Bishop and the grandmother of Matt Bishop.

Partial bibliography 
 Stars were Born (1936)
 The Trembling of the Sea (1938)
 Anna Collett (1948)

References 

Recipients of the Benemerenti medal
English Roman Catholic writers
Catholic Workers
1911 births
2009 deaths